HMS Briton was a  wooden screw corvette built for the Royal Navy in the late 1860s.

Notes

Footnotes

Bibliography

External links
Briton at William Loney website
Briton at the Naval Database website

Ships built in Sheerness
Corvettes of the Royal Navy
1869 ships
Victorian-era corvettes of the United Kingdom